America in Black is a television program in the form of a news magazine that first premiered on February 19, 2023, on BET.

Overview
America in Black was created to bring awareness to modern issues surrounding Black America, including education, music, politics, and  historic oppression. A typical episode highlights news stories within the Black communities of the United States, often relying on television or news personalities to interview experts, celebrities, athletes, musicians, politicians, or other notable public figures. At the end of each episode, Roy Wood Jr. has a segment titled the "mic drop."

Episodes

References

External links

2020s American documentary television series
2023 American television series debuts
BET original programming
English-language television shows
Historical television series